Delsjö Golf Club is a golf club located 3 km south of central Gothenburg, Sweden. It has hosted the Delsjö Ladies Open and Gothenburg Ladies Open on the Ladies European Tour.

History
Located in the Delsjön Nature Reserve in eastern Gothenburg, a reservoir for the city, construction was approved by the Gothenburg Municipality Assembly on 17 September 1959 after much wrangling. The municipal course, rare for Sweden, was built with the help of 13 corporate sponsors. The club was admitted to the Swedish Golf Federation in 1962 and the full 18 hole course was completed in 1965.

Together with Royal Drottningholm Golf Club the club hosted the Volvo Open in 1970, where Frenchman Jean Garaïalde ultimately prevailed over Jack Nicklaus by one shot, while The Open champions  Bob Charles, Peter Thomson and Kel Nagle trailed further behind. It also hosted the Delsjö Ladies Open and the Gothenburg Ladies Open on the Ladies European Tour in 1985 and 1988. 

Karin Sjödin and Linda Wessberg are two LPGA Tour players that grew up playing at the club, along with European Tour winner Sebastian Söderberg.

Tournaments hosted

Swedish Golf Tour
Delsjö Ladies Open – 19962013–2014
Gothenburg Ladies Open – 1997–1998

Amateur tournaments
Swedish International Stroke Play Championship – 19691974

See also
List of golf courses in Sweden

References

External links

Golf clubs and courses in Sweden